Unisinos (Portuguese: Universidade do Vale do Rio dos Sinos -- literally "University of Sinos' River Valley") is a Brazilian private Jesuit university founded in 1969. Its main campus is located in Southern Brazil, in the city of São Leopoldo, state of Rio Grande do Sul (Sinos River valley region). Unisinos has more than 30,000 students in its 91 undergraduate programs, 19 academic master's programs, 6 professional master's programs, and 14 PhD programs, with six schools – Polytechnic, Business, Law, Health, Creative Industry, and Humanities.

Unisinos has a strategic orientation in Science, Technology, and Innovation with a global dimension. Unisinos' campus has a technological park, TECNOSINOS, which consists of 75 companies from 10 different countries, including the South Korean HT Micron and the German SAP Labs Latin America. Together, these companies are responsible for 6,000 direct job positions.

TECNOSINOS was selected as the best technological park in Brazil by ANPROTEC (National Association of Entities Promoting Innovative ventures) in 2010 and 2014. In 2014, its incubated company was named best in the world by SBPA Simulators. Academically, Unisinos ranks first among private undergraduate universities and second among private universities in Brazil.

History
In 1869, in São Leopoldo, Rio Grande do Sul state, the Jesuits founded Colégio Nossa Senhora da Conceição, the first official school in the state. The Cristo Rei School of Philosophy, Sciences and Literature was officially recognized in 1953. It was later named São Leopoldo School of Philosophy, Sciences and Literature. A century after its beginning, on July 31, 1969, the feast of Saint Ignatius of Loyola, Unisinos received official recognition as a university. It is part of a network of more than 200 Jesuit colleges and universities worldwide, with 2.2 million students.

Unisinos has more than 900 professors – of whom 86% have either a Master's or a Doctor's degree, which is above the national level – and about 900 employees on its staff. More than 55,000 alumni have graduated from Unisinos.

In 2004, Unisinos became the first university in Latin America and one of five in the world to receive ISO 14001 certification, which is granted to institutions committed to the natural environment.

Institutes
The Humanitas Unisinos Institute (IHU) develops and articulates projects involving research, studies, reflections, analyses, and services. It finds solutions to challenges using Christian humanism. Every year it produces 30 publications and 200 lectures.

The Information Technology Institute promotes courses, services and events, applying scientific knowledge to solutions for companies and professionals linked to the field of information technology. It offers 300 technological courses in São Leopoldo, Porto Alegre or in companies. It offers consulting and assistance services, as well as entrepreneurial missions, with 1,500 participants per year.

The Anchietano Research Institute is a study center in areas such as Archaeology and Anthropology. The museum houses objects from the culture of the Native American populations, mainly from Rio Grande do Sul, including missionary statues as well as images, books, tools, and sacred altars of the 20th century.

Social Action in Unisinos has 13 social projects in partnership with communities, collective groups, cooperatives and associations. The fields are: health, education for children, teenagers and young adults, labor, legal advice, religions, human aging and academic inclusion. The projects involve 45 teachers and 350 students, reaching 150,000 people each year.

Unicidade is a movement aimed at the economic and social development of the region and involves the creation of partnerships between Unisinos and social sectors, both public and private. Its main objective is to use the academic apparatus (teaching, research and continuing education) in order to make a better world. The partner of Unisinos in this movement is Bank Santander.

The Eurocentre Unisinos is part of a network of operators of the AI-Invest program in Latin America. It is maintained with resources from the European Union and aims at promoting and strengthening the cooperation between European and Latin American companies. 

The Agency for Integration and Development (AID-Unisinos) obtains external resources for partnerships which stimulate university actions for regional development. The activities involve undergraduate, graduate and continuing education students.

Museum of Geological History of Rio Grande do Sul

The museum was inaugurated on July 31, 2006 and is in Building 6 Unisinos. It contains samples of minerals, rocks and fossils that tell the early history of Rio Grande do Sul. It aims to recreate a part of the history of Rio Grande do Sul, told through more than 8000 objects brought from the Geopark of Paleorrota by professionals in the fields of geology and biology. These provide evidential knowledge for courses in geology and biology at this and other universities.

The university has contributed to the research and preservation of paleontological sites of geopark of Paleorrota.

See also
 Paleorrota Geopark
 Brazil university rankings
 List of Jesuit sites
 Universities and higher education in Brazil

References

External links 
 Official website (in Portuguese)
 (in English)
 (in Spanish)

1969 establishments in Brazil
Catholic universities and colleges in Brazil
Educational institutions established in 1969
Jesuit universities and colleges
Universities and colleges in Rio Grande do Sul